Hermann Vetter (born c. 1933) is a German academic and translator who has made many works of English-language philosophy available in German. He specialized in sociology of knowledge and social psychology. His academic career was interrupted by the "student revolutions" of the 1960s.

Bibliography

As translator
Karl R. Popper, Objektive Erkenntnis. Ein evolutionärer Entwurf (Objective Knowledge: An Evolutionary Approach). Hoffmann und Campe, 1974.
Robert Nozick, Anarchie, Staat, Utopia (Anarchy, State, and Utopia). Moderne Verlags Gesellschaft, 1976.
Thomas S. Kuhn, Die Struktur wissenschaftlicher Revolutionen (The Structure of Scientific Revolutions). Suhrkamp, 1976. With Kurt Simon.
Michael Sukale (ed.), Moderne Sprachphilosophie. Hoffmann und Campe, 1976.
W. V. O. Quine, Die Wurzeln der Referenz (The Roots of Reference). Suhrkamp, 1976.
Thomas S. Kuhn, Die Entstehung des Neuen: Studien zur Struktur der Wissenschaftsgeschichte (The Essential Tension: Selected Studies in Scientific Tradition and Change). Suhrkamp, 1978.
Erving Goffman, Rahmen-Analyse (Frame Analysis). Suhrkamp, 1979.
John Rawls, Eine Theorie der Gerechtigkeit (A Theory of Justice). Suhrkamp, 1979.
Paul Feyerabend, Wider den Methodenzwang. Skizzen einer anarchistischen Erkenntnistheorie (Against Method). Suhrkamp, 1983.
Anthony Kenny, Wittgenstein. Suhrkamp Verlag, 1989.
Anthony Kenny, ed., Illustrierte Geschichte der westlichen Philosophie (The Oxford Illustrated History of Western Philosophy). Campus Verlag, 1995.
Peter Singer, Wie sollen wir leben? Ethik in einer egoistischen Zeit (How Are We to Live?). Harald Fischer, 1996.
Will Kymlicka, Politische Philosophie heute: Eine Einführung (Contemporary Political Philosophy: An Introduction). Campus, 1997.
Richard Rorty, Stolz auf unser Land. Die amerikanische Linke und der Patriotismus (Achieving Our Country). Suhrkamp, 1999.
Robert Brandom, Expressive Vernunft: Begründung, Repräsentation und diskursive Festlegung (Making It Explicit). Suhrkamp, 2000. With Eva Gilmer.

As author
Hermann Vetter, Wahrscheinlichkeit und Logischer Spielraum - Eine Untersuchung zur induktiven Logik. Mohr. 1967.
Hermann Vetter, "Logical Probability, Mathematical Statistics, and the Problem of Induction". Synthese 20 (1) 1969:56 - 71.
Hermann Vetter, "The Production of Children as a Problem of Utilitarian Ethics". Inquiry 12 (1-4) 1969:445-447.
Hermann Vetter, "Utilitarianism and New Generations". Mind 80 (318) 1971:301-302.

References 

Anti-natalists
English–German translators
German philosophers
German translators
Living people
German male non-fiction writers
Year of birth missing (living people)